Carlos Alberto Gajardo Zúñiga (born 20 May 1976) is a Chilean former footballer who played as a defensive midfielder for clubs in Chile and Brazil.

Career
Born in Tocopilla, Chile, Gajardo was with Escuela de Deportes Codelco and took part of Tocopilla city team as a youth player, before joining Cobreloa youth system in 1994. Next he had stints on loan at Deportes Antofagasta, where he played as a right-back, and Deportes Ovalle in 1996 and 1997, respectively.

He left the football activity for two years (1998–99) due to a knee injury. After playing for Club Deportivo Arauco from Tocopilla in 2000, he spent two seasons with Coquimbo Unido in the Chilean top division, making forty eight appearances and scoring one goal.

In 2003, he moved to Brazil alongside his fellow footballer Axel Ahumada and joined Centro Sportivo Alagoano.

Post-retirement
Gajardo went on playing football at amateur level, taking part of Mini Mundial, a traditional championship in his city of birth. In addition, he has supported football activities for children in the same city.

He also has been involved in fishing as a seashore harvester.

References

External links
 Carlos Gajardo at SoccerStats.us
 

1976 births
Living people
People from Tocopilla
Chilean footballers
Chilean expatriate footballers
Chilean Primera División players
Cobreloa footballers
C.D. Antofagasta footballers
Coquimbo Unido footballers
Primera B de Chile players
Deportes Ovalle footballers
Campeonato Brasileiro Série C players
Centro Sportivo Alagoano players
Chilean expatriate sportspeople in Brazil
Expatriate footballers in Brazil
Association football midfielders